Seven Keys to Baldpate is a 1917 American silent mystery/thriller film produced by George M. Cohan and distributed by Artcraft Pictures, an affiliate of Paramount. The film is based on Cohan's 1913 play of the 1913 novel by Earl Derr Biggers. Cohan himself stars in this silent version along with Anna Q. Nilsson and Hedda Hopper, billed under her real name Elda Furry. One version of the play preceded this movie in 1916 and numerous versions followed in the succeeding decades such as the early RKO talkie starring Richard Dix.

Seven Keys to Baldpate is an extant film with much home video availability.

Plot
As described in a film magazine, George Washington Magee (Cohan) bets a companion $5,000 that he can write a bestseller in twenty-four hours. He goes to an isolated summer hotel in the mountains, receives the only key to the place, and sets about his task. Soon he is interrupted by complications as guests arrive, unexpected and uninvited, each with their own key to the deserted hotel. Two hundred thousand dollars gets deposited in the hotel safe, a young woman is shot, and, while the author holds the crooks at bay waiting for the police to arrive, they cook up a scheme to turn the tables on George. The woman's body disappears from the room, and the crooks are marched off to prison by U.S. Secret Service men. The caretaker returns the following night and congratulates the author on his success, and a lady reporter capitulates under the smiles of the industrious writer.

Cast
 George M. Cohan as George Washington Magee
 Anna Q. Nilsson as Mary Norton
 Elda Furry as Myra Thornhill
 Corene Uzzell as Mrs. Rhodes
 Joseph W. Smiley as Mayor Cargan
 Armand Cortes as Lou Max
 Warren Cook as Thomas Hayden (credited as C. Warren Cook)
 Purnell Pratt as John Bland
 Frank Losee as Hall Bentley
 Eric Hudson as Peter the Hermit
 Carleton Macy as Police Chief Kennedy
 Paul Everton as Langdon
 Russell Bassett as Quimby
 Robert Dudley as Clerk[[File:Seven Keys to Baldpate (1917) - 1.jpg|thumb| Advertisement on p.26 of the August 24, 1917 Variety]]

Critical reception
In Fantastic Movie Musings and Ramblings, Dave Sindelar wrote, "Cohan himself appears in the lead role. This was his first of only a handful of screen appearances, and he does a fine job...The plot is far-fetched and sometimes confusing, and the fact that some sections of the plot are replaced by title cards doesn’t help, but I like the backstory, and there’s definitely an air of parody to the proceedings. At this point of time, I’d have to say it’s my favorite version of the story."

See also
 The House That Shadows Built (1931 promotional film by Paramount; a possibility that the unnamed Cohan clip is from Seven Keys to Baldpate'')

References

External links

 
 
  (free download)

1917 films
1910s mystery thriller films
American mystery thriller films
American silent feature films
American black-and-white films
Films based on American novels
American films based on plays
Films directed by Hugh Ford
American independent films
1917 drama films
Films based on adaptations
American drama films
Films based on Seven Keys to Baldpate
Films based on works by George M. Cohan
1910s independent films
1910s American films
Silent American drama films
Silent mystery thriller films
1910s English-language films